"Somebody to Love" (originally titled "Someone to Love") is a rock song that was written by Darby Slick. It was originally recorded by The Great Society, and later by Jefferson Airplane. Rolling Stone magazine ranked Jefferson Airplane's version No. 274 on their list of the 500 Greatest Songs of All Time.

Background
Written by The Great Society guitarist Darby Slick after realizing his girlfriend had left him, and first performed by that band, which included his then-sister-in-law Grace Slick on vocals, the song made little impact outside of the club circuit in the Bay Area.  The song was recorded on December 4, 1965, and released in February 1966 as a single with the B-side another Darby Slick composition titled "Free Advice" on the Northbeach label (Northbeach 1001) and received minimal circulation outside of San Francisco. San Francisco in the mid-1960s was the center of free love, but Darby Slick saw a downside to this ethos, as it could lead to jealousy and disconnect. This song champions loyalty and monogamy, as the singer implores us to find that one true love that will nurture us and get us through the tough times. However, the lyrics do not treat love as something that randomly happens to a person, but rather as an action that a person, male or female, may choose to take. This subtle but profound difference in philosophy places this song in opposition to songs that speak of "falling in love" as if love is something that happens to a person outside of their conscious intention.

Re-recording
When Grace Slick departed to join Jefferson Airplane, she took this song with her, bringing it to the Surrealistic Pillow sessions, along with her own composition "White Rabbit".  Subsequently, the Airplane's more ferocious rock and roll version became the band's first and biggest success, reaching No. 5 on the Billboard Hot 100. The group's first hit song, "Somebody To Love" was also one of the first big hits to come out of the US West Coast and San Francisco Bay area counterculture scene, to which numerous artists and musicians would be drawn over the following few years.

Slick's original performance of the song with The Great Society is more subdued, with the Jefferson Airplane version sounding far more accusatory and menacing on lines such as "Your mind is so full of red" and "Your friends, baby, they treat you like a guest." The lyrics are in the second person, with each two-line verse setting a scene of alienation and despair, and the chorus repeating the title of the song, with slight variations such as: "... / Don't you need somebody to love? / Wouldn't you love somebody to love? / ..."  Like the album on which it appeared, this song was instrumental in publicizing the existence of the Haight-Ashbury counterculture to the rest of the United States.

Reception
Billboard described the song as a "wild dance number loaded with vocal excitement," calling it a "hard driver, featuring powerful female vocal in the lead [which] never stops from start to finish."  Cash Box called the single a "bright, pulsating, rhythmic, sometimes-frenetic, funky rock outing."  Brett Milano of udiscovermusic.com rated Jorma Kaukonen's psychedelic guitar solo at the end of the song as one of the 100 all-time greatest, stating that it opens "with those three sustained wailing notes and [closes] with those sign-off chords that leave the song forever unresolved."

Personnel
 Grace Slick – lead vocals
 Marty Balin – tambourine, backup singing
 Jorma Kaukonen – lead guitar (Guild Thunderbird, per biography)
 Paul Kantner – rhythm guitar  (Rickenbacker 360/12)
 Jack Casady – bass (Fender Jazz Bass)
 Spencer Dryden – drums

Charts

Weekly charts

Year-end charts

Certifications

Commercial usage

A Serious Man
Jefferson Aiplane's studio release was used at the beginning of the Coen brothers' A Serious Man, just after the opening short story about the dybbuk and the title graphic. The Coens invited their longtime musical scorer, Carter Burwell, to compose a musical bridge for the title graphic to help transition from a pre-WWII Ashkenazi shtetl to St. Louis Park, Minnesota in 1967, where Danny Gopnik is listening to the song on an earpiece during his Hebrew language class at school. Burwell responded by adding a dark, brooding introduction to Somebody To Love using the same model electric guitar and bass used in the original studio recording, and played through similar amps by selected musicians. Referring to the sound fidelity, Burwell commented, "it was difficult to reduce our overall sound quality to that of the original recording. We did our best."

Boogie Pimps version

A remix of "Somebody to Love" was the debut single of German electronic music duo Boogie Pimps. It was first released in Germany in April 2003 and became a worldwide hit the following year, reaching No. 3 on the UK Singles Chart and No. 7 on the Irish Singles Chart. The song also became a top-twenty hit in Australia, Denmark, Finland, Germany, and the Netherlands. In most of these territories, this was their only hit single, as the follow-up single "Sunny" failed to chart.

Background and release
In December 2001, Mark J. Klak and Mirko Jacob of Boogie Pimps decided to cover the song after watching the 1998 film Fear and Loathing in Las Vegas, in which "Somebody to Love" is featured. The band's result initially failed to attract attention from German record labels, but the song soon became popular via underground white label releases. It was then picked up by German label Superstar Recordings and released as an official single on April 7, 2003. In the United Kingdom, it was released on January 5, 2004, while in Australia, it was issued as a CD single on January 26, 2004.

Track listings
German maxi-CD single
 "Somebody to Love" (radio edit) – 3:30
 "Somebody to Love" (radio mix (clear)) – 3:46
 "Somebody to Love" (main club mix) – 5:10
 "Somebody to Love" (Moonbootica mix) – 6:54
 "Somebody to Love" (ClubReise (Mirko Jacob mix)) – 5:24
 "Somebody to Love" (CaterpillarClassich (Mark J Klak mix)) – 7:10

UK CD single
 "Somebody to Love" (radio edit)
 "Somebody to Love" (DJ Flex executive edit)
 "Somebody to Love" (Pimps club mix)
 "Somebody to Love" (DJ Flex executive remix)
 "Somebody to Love" (Ian Knowles remix)
 "Somebody to Love" (CD-ROM video)

Australian CD single
 "Somebody to Love" (radio edit) – 2:59
 "Somebody to Love" (club mix) – 6:02
 "Somebody to Love" (DJ Flex & Sandy Wilhelm executive remix) – 7:38
 "Somebody to Love" (Santos Somebody to Rock remix) – 6:47
 "Somebody to Love" (Santos Another Planet remix) – 7:48
 "Somebody to Love" (Raymond Barry remix) – 5:33

Charts

Weekly charts

Year-end charts

Certifications

Release history

References

External links
 Jefferson Airplane - Somebody To Love, American Bandstand, 1967. (video – 2:57 minutes). (Licensed to YouTube by SME (on behalf of The Store For Music Ltd).)

1966 songs
1966 singles
1967 singles
2003 debut singles
Data Records singles
Jefferson Airplane songs
Marcella Detroit songs
Ministry of Sound singles
Ramones songs
RCA Victor singles
Song recordings produced by Rick Jarrard
Ultra Records singles